Ħamrun Spartans Football Club is a professional football club based in Ħamrun, Malta. Since being founded in 1907, Ħamrun Spartans have won eight league championships while being runners-up eleven times.

One of the stalwarts in the club history, Stefan Sultana, has scored a total of 252 goals in his career (225 of them while playing for the club), which makes him Malta's top-scorer (per 12 May 2007).

History

Ħamrun Spartans were founded in 1907. By season 1913–14, Ħamrun Spartans were already an established team on the local scene winning the title during that season thanks to a better goal-average than St. George's. Their second League success came four years later when they finished again in joint top-spot with St. George's. This time the Spartans were crowned Champions of Malta by beating them in a playoff. Ħamrun's top player at that time was Gejtu Psaila, known as il-Hacca. In the 1920s and 1930s, the club went through a difficult period as most Ħamrun players left to join other clubs.

A new team, Ħamrun Liberty was formed and in just a couple of years, Ħamrun Liberty was among the elite of Maltese football. On their return to the First Division in 1946–47, the club changed its name to Ħamrun Spartans. They were soon a hit as they won the Johnnie Walker Championship Trophy, winning also the Cassar Cup. They won the Cassar Cup again in 1948–49 season. For four times between 1947 and 1952, they were four times runners-up.

The team started dwindling down in the 60's until they were relegated in the season 1969–70. After returning to the First Division, they were relegated once again in 1973–74. However, after two years in the Second Division, they were back in the First Division.

On the 75th anniversary, in season 1982–83, the club was back at the top winning the title after an absence of 36 years. Ħamrun also won the FA Trophy during that season. That was the beginning of an era under the guide of president Victor Tedesco. The team was strengthened with top players like Gigi Salerno, Raymond and George Xuereb, Edwin Farrugia, Raymond Vella, Joe Brincat and Carlo Seychell. Alfred Cardona was their coach. After a lot of disputes with the Immigration Division, Victor Tedesco signed two foreigners, Englishmen Peter Hatch and John Linacre – the first foreigners to play on the island after a long period of time.

The Spartans set a new record being the first local team to win both the home and away legs in a UEFA competition after beating Ballymena of Northern Ireland. In a decade, Ħamrun won three league titles, three FA Trophies, the Super Cup and Euro Cup twice each.

After such successful campaigns, the Spartans faced financial difficulties. The team had to transfer its best players until finally they were relegated to the First Division in 1998–99. After one year, they were promoted back to the Premier League after winning the Division 1 title.

The last four seasons were years of ups-and-downs. They were relegated to Division 1 at the end of season 2003–04, winning promotion as First Division champions in 2004–05, being relegated in 2005–06 and winning the First Division championship once again in 2006–07.

The team won the Maltese First Division in 2006–07. Following the promotion to the Maltese Premier League the Spartans finished in 6th place in 2007–08 and met all their objectives and even ended up in the final of the FA Trophy against Birkirkara FC losing with honours in the last minute by a 1-goal difference. This season was also a great success to its supporters after winning the Malta Best Support Award.

Seemingly having been strengthened in several departments, Ħamrun Spartans aimed to challenge for a place in Europe the following season. Yet, the team failed to reach the championship pool. In the relegation pool Ħamrun started with an excellent 3–0 win over Msida St. Joseph, then suffered a shock 1–5 defeat against Tarxien Rainbows. Four points over the next three games were not enough to reach safety, and in the final game, a depleted Ħamrun side was easily defeated by Qormi FC. With Tarxien and Msida also reaching 16 points following the draw between them, Ħamrun Spartans were relegated on the worst head-to-head record. The corruption cases resulting involving Vittoriosa Stars and Marsaxlokk meant both "relegated" teams remained in the Premier Division for the 2009–10 season.

The 2009–10 season Ħamrun Spartans made success because they finished in the eight position of the Maltese Premier League with the last game was in the Relegation Pool against Msida with the final result was a draw of 2–2.

Ħamrun Spartans faced more difficulties and albeit staying in the top division for some years, they were relegated to the Maltese First Division in the 2012–13 season. Worse was to follow when the team was relegated to the Maltese Second Division – the worst ever placing in its history. Ħamrun Spartans gained promotion from the Second Division by placing in the second position in the season 2014–15. Ħamrun, now will play in the Maltese First Division (Season 2015–16).

The 2015–16 season ended successfully for Ħamrun Spartans FC. The team finished in second place in the First Division and was promoted to the Premier Division after an absence of four years. In this period the administration of the club improved greatly and many difficulties, mainly financial, were surmounted. New enthusiasm and optimism embraced the club. The supporters were looking forward for a fresh start.

In the 2016-17 season Hamrun regained Premier League status and the following season established themselves in the Premier League as the shout of "we're hear to stay" from the fans grew stronger.

The 2018-19 season was one of high success. The team, led by Italian coach Giovanni Tedesco defied the odds and finished in 4th place after getting a 94th minute equaliser in the last match of the season against arch rivals Valletta which forced the latter to play a decider for the title. Hamrun fans dreamt that European competition was once again in reach but Balzan beat Valletta in the final of the FA Trophy, which meant that Balzan occupied the 4th and last Maltese slot in European football.

The 2019-20 season saw the team under new Coach Manuele Blasi.  The team performed well initially but due to financial difficulties had to release key players.  Blasi was replaced by Andrea Ciaramella in early 2020 with the team ending in 9th position when the league was suspended due to the Covid pandemic in March 2020 with 6 matches left to play.

In the summer of 2020 intense negotiations took place to find solid financial backing for Hamrun Spartans F.C.  These proved successful when J. Portelli Projects agreed to take control of the club.  The club immediately signed three of the most promising young Malta National Team players - Juan Carlos Corbalan, Joseph Mbong and Matthew Guillaumier.  A professional corporate image was given to the club and it began the 2020–21 season strongly, sitting top of the league at the end of 2020. After the halt of the league decided by the Malta Football Association in April, Spartans were declared champions of the league, 30 years after the last title.

On 9 June 2021, the club was excluded from participating in the 2021–22 UEFA Champions League for being involved in a match fixing scandal back in 2013.

On 11 August 2022, after a victory over Levski Sofia on penalties, Ħamrun became the first ever Maltese side to reach the play-off stage of a UEFA club competition; where they played against the famous Serbian club Partizan, who proved too strong. Having lost 4-1 in Belgrade in the first leg, Ħamrun managed to achieve a highly respectable and entertaining 3–3 draw in the second leg back in Malta. The Spartans had beaten Alashkert, Velež Mostar  and Levski Sofia in the first three rounds of qualifying to set up a meeting with the Serbian side.

Club officials

Technical staff 

 Head Coach: Branko Nišević
 Assistant Coach: Stefano De Angelis
 Goalkeepers Coach: Reuben Debono
 Team Manager: David Camilleri
 Kit Manager: Gilbert Camilleri
 Assistant Kit Managers: Gaetano Camilleri, Jason Mangani

Management 

 President: Joseph Portelli
 Vice President: Gaetano Debattista 
 Secretary: Stephen Saliba 
 Treasurer: Antoine Attard
 MFA Council Member: Victor Cassar
 Spiritual Director: Rev. Anton Portelli

Current squad

Former players

  Orazio Sorbello
  Tony Morley
  Cristian Zaccardo

Recent managers 

 Michael Degiorgio (2005–06)
 Atanas Marinov (2006–07)
 Marco Gerada (2007–08)
 Steve D'Amato (Oct 2008–11)
 Jesmond Zammit (2011–12)
 Stefan Sultana (Feb 2012–13)
 Giuseppe Forasassi (2013–14)
 Steve D'Amato (2014–16)
 Jacques Scerri (2016–18)
 Giovanni Tedesco (2018–19)
 Manuele Blasi (2019–20)
 Andrea Ciaramella (2020)
 Mark Buttigieg (2020-2022)
 Branko Nišević (2022-)

Honours 

Maltese Premier League
Winners (9): 1913–14, 1917–18, 1946–47, 1982–83, 1986–87, 1987–88, 1990–91, 2020–21, 2022–23
Maltese FA Trophy
Winners (6): 1982–83, 1983–84, 1986–87, 1987–88, 1988–89, 1991–92 
Maltese Super Cup
Winners (5): 1987, 1988, 1989, 1991, 1992 
Euro Challenge Cup
Winners (4): 1985, 1988, 1991, 1992
Cassar Cup
Winners (2): 1947–47, 1948–49
Super 5 Tournament (Quadrangular Tournament)
Winners (1): 1991–1992

European competitions

Youth Nursery
Hamrun Spartans Youth Nursery was founded by Tony Bajada in December 1987. At the time the Nursery catered for around 40 players.

Further reading

References

External links 
 Profile on Malta's Football Association website

 
Football clubs in Malta
Association football clubs established in 1907
1907 establishments in Malta